The Executioner is the name of different fictional characters appearing in American comic books published by Marvel Comics.

Skurge, an Asgardian, is originally depicted as a supervillain who wields a magic double-bladed battle axe. Skurge falls in love with the Enchantress and is frequently used in schemes by her and the trickster god Loki. He is a long-time antagonist of Thor and other heroes of the Marvel universe and is a member of the original Masters of Evil. Eventually, he joins the heroes of Asgard in a mission to Hel, where he sacrifices his axe to destroy Naglfar, the ship of the dead, and delays Ragnarok, sacrificing his life to hold the bridge at Gjallarbrú so the heroes can escape the forces of Hel. After a time trapped in Hel, he joins the honored dead in Valhalla.

The name was later used by two other characters: an axe-wielding android member of the Crazy Gang and a vigilante named Daniel DuBois, the son of Princess Python.

Skurge has made several appearances in media, such as animated television series, video games, and the Marvel Cinematic Universe film Thor: Ragnarok (2017), in which he was portrayed by Karl Urban.

Publication history
The Executioner first appeared in Journey into Mystery #103 (April 1964), and was created by Stan Lee and Jack Kirby.

Fictional character biography

Skurge
Skurge was born in Jotunheim; he is the son of an unnamed Storm Giant and an unnamed Skornheim goddess, making him a half-giant. He later becomes a warrior, gaining the name Executioner after fighting in a war against the Storm Giants. Skurge has always had feelings for Amora, the Enchantress, and regularly aids her in various evil schemes to gain control of Asgard. However, the Enchantress only manipulates him, using her charms to keep Skurge under her thrall. Loki, the trickster god, also has used Skurge many times.

In his first appearance, the Executioner teams with the Enchantress to battle Thor at the behest of Loki. He exiles Jane Foster to another dimension and tries to get Thor to surrender his hammer to him in exchange for Jane. Thor agrees to this, but when the Enchantress turns Skurge to a tree for bringing Foster back he releases Thor from the bargain, whereupon Thor returns the two to Asgard. The Executioner and the Enchantress are exiled to Earth by Odin, where they learn of Zemo from a newspaper. They become members of Baron Heinrich Zemo's original Masters of Evil and fight the Avengers. The Executioner disguises himself as a former aide of Zemo, and lures Captain America to Zemo's kingdom, while the Enchantress uses her powers to turn Thor against the Avengers. Later the Executioner helps Zemo escape from Captain America by knocking out Cap. Skurge remained with Baron Zemo's Masters of Evil for some time. The Masters of Evil created Wonder Man, who was meant to trick and destroy the Avengers. When the Executioner was defeated by Wonder Man testing his power, he worried about controlling him, though Zemo revealed Wonder Man would die within a week unless given an antidote. The gloating Skurge was derided by Wonder Man, who did not like the need for trickery and deceit. The group's plan to kill the Avengers was thwarted by Wonder Man, and Skurge and his allies were defeated.

The Executioner menaced Jane Foster, and fought Balder as any ally of Loki. He was later among the legion of villains assembled by Doctor Doom to destroy the Fantastic Four using a mind-control machine, but due to Mister Fantastic the villains all had their memory of this event erased.

Apart from the Enchantress, Skurge attempted to establish an empire by the conquest of an alternate future 25th Century Earth. He battled the Hulk after he was accidentally transported there.

He was reunited with the Enchantress, and joined the Mandarin's attempted world conquest with four other villains after being taken to his base by teleportation technology. He attacked the Asian sub-continent with an army of trolls due to the valuable diamonds that were there, and fought Hercules in another dimension he had transported them to with his axe, but was beaten and thrown at a giant the Enchantress had created to defeat the Scarlet Witch, destroying it.

He next led a Troll invasion of Asgard. Odin banished him to the realm of Casiolena. Skurge abandoned the Enchantress to become Casiolena's co-ruler. He led Casiolena's forces against the Defenders, and resumed his alliance with the Enchantress.

Skurge attacked Dr. Strange alongside Enchantress, but they were defeated. He later battled the Defenders and the Thing as the Enchantress's ally.

Skurge led an assault on Asgard, and fought Balder again. With the Enchantress, he serves as Loki's lieutenant during his brief rule of Asgard. With the Enchantress, he joined with the forces of Asgard against the legions of the most powerful fire demon Surtur.

Once Amora the Enchantress set her sights on Heimdall as a potential lover, Skurge sought to ease the wounds of his heart in battle, joining Thor, Balder, and the Einherjar on a rescue mission into Hel. A group of souls belonging to living humans had been trapped there by Malekith the Accursed, and Hela had refused to permit them to return to Midgard (Earth). Despite initial misgivings, Thor permitted Skurge to accompany the group. Skurge is tempted by the appearance of Amora, who claims Heimdall had slain her. This was not Amora, but Mordonna, a shape-shifting sorceress in the employ of Hela. The disguise is revealed when Skurge decides to trust Balder more than the desires of his own heart. Hela whisks Mordonna away before Skurge can gain revenge.

Naglfar, the ship of the dead, is nearing ready to sail, and Hela promises Skurge a place of honor beside her on it at the battle of Ragnarok. Enraged at being manipulated, Skurge destroys the ship with his axe, forestalling the end of days. The group is pursued out of Hel, and at the bridge Gjallerbru Thor swears to hold the bridge as long as he can so that the souls of the mortals can reach freedom. Seeking redemption for a wasted life, Skurge knocks Thor unconscious, and tells Balder he will take the thunder god's place. Skurge's last request is to ask Balder to promise that Thor and he would drink to the memory of Skurge. Balder consents, and he, the Einherjar and the mortal souls depart Hel with the unconscious Thor. Skurge defends Gjallerbru with the M16 rifles the Einherjar had brought from Earth for the expedition, and does not let a single demon pass.  An impressed Hela pays him tribute, saying, "He stood alone at Gjallerbru. And that answer is enough." He was eventually overrun and killed by Hela's forces.

Following his death, he remains in Hel until Thor - currently cursed by Hela so that his bones would become brittle and never heal while simultaneously being immortal - assumes control of the Destroyer and attacks Hela's domain. Skurge attempts to use diplomacy to reach Thor's spirit inside the armor, but is knocked out by Thor. Unknown to all, this is all part of Thor's plan to force her to remove the curse, which she does before the thunder god can destroy Hel. Afterwards, Skurge tells Thor he guessed that Thor was truly in control when the Destroyer spared his life rather than killing him. Thor asks Skurge if there is anything he could do, and Skurge reminds Thor of his promise have a drink in his name as they had promised. Recognizing that Skurge's honor and courage belonged somewhere better, Hela allows him to depart her realm and releases him to Valhalla. Thor and Balder are said to have many drinks to Skurge's name.

While there, his spirit was summoned from Valhalla by the Grandmaster as a member of his Legion of the Unliving, and he battled Thor. His spirit was freed from Hela's prison when he led the other escaped Einherjar to join an assault on Hela's forces by the Asgardians and New Mutants. He earned for himself a place in Valhalla, Asgard's place for honored dead. After his death, the Enchantress realized that she truly possessed feelings for Skurge and mourned his demise. The time-travelling villain Zarkko the Tomorrow Man once pulled him and eight other villains out of the Timestream to battle the Thor Corps, but he was defeated.

Once, Amora gave the Executioner's axe to a mortal man called Brute Benhurst. Thor, believing him Skurge (this second Executioner wore a mask), tried not to fight him until the Executioner hit Kevin Masterson (son of Eric Masterson). Thor recognized hitting a boy as an ignoble thing which Skurge would never do, and defeated the new Executioner.

Odin later recruits Skurge to aid Eric Masterson in fighting off the influence of the Bloodaxe, the former weapon that Skurge wielded.

Enchantress attempts to attack Yggdrasil to free Executioner from Valhalla, although doing so threatens all reality. She is stopped by Thor, Loki, and Balder, who convince her that her actions are dishonoring Skurge's memory.

Kid Loki disguised himself as Enchantress to get Executioner out of Hel so that he can assist the Asgardians of the Galaxy in securing the Nagalfar Beacon.

During the "War of the Realms" storyline, Executioner and the Asgardians of the Galaxy fought against Malekith the Accursed's forces. Executioner was hit many times by the arrows fired by the Asgardian Angels. Before he died from his injuries, he opened a portal from Heven so that Angela can kill the Queen of Angels. Executioner was surprised to find himself in Valhalla.

Crazy Gang
The Executioner is a silent android swathed in a long robe and hood and armed with an axe. It follows the commands of the Red Queen and seems to lack any real intelligence. It was destroyed under unknown circumstances, but it had been destroyed and repaired before.

Daniel DuBois
A character named The Executioner (Daniel DuBois) appears in Dark Reign: Young Avengers. He is described as "a rich and organized urban vigilante who hunts and kills criminal scum. And likes to hurt pets." It is later revealed that this Executioner is the son of Princess Python, and knows Kate Bishop from school, and is aware of her secret identity, knowledge that he uses to try to blackmail his way onto the team.

Executioner is not aware of his mother's identity as Princess Python until it is actually pointed out to him. However, it may be that he was simply in denial about this matter, as Norman Osborn comments that if his mother was Princess Python, then he would like to think he would know and Kate Bishop immediately realizes who she is upon meeting her.

Powers and abilities
Skurge possessed the superhuman abilities of a typical male Asgardian. Due to his unique hybrid physiology, with a half Storm-Giant and half Skornheimian pedigree, Skurge's physical strength, stamina and durability were considerably greater than those of the average Asgardian male. He also possessed superhuman visual acuity. Skurge was extremely long-lived, aging at a much slower pace than human beings, though not truly immortal. His body was highly resistant to physical damage, and he was immune to terrestrial diseases, toxins, and some magic. In the event of injury, Skurge's godly lifeforce would allow him to recover with a superhuman rate. Skurge had proficiency at hand-to-hand combat, and mastery of most Asgardian weapons. He would often fight wielding his large, enchanted, double-bladed battle axe that allowed him a number of abilities including cutting rifts into other dimensions and control over fire and ice that he could project at his enemies. Skurge also sometimes wore an enchanted impregnable horned helmet that completely covered his head. In his first appearance, Skurge demonstrated a 'super-human falcon hunting vision', that enabled him to find Jane Foster in a crowd.

The second Executioner is a vigilante with no super powers.

Other versions

Earth-238
Captain Britain was sent to an alternate Earth, known as Earth-238, by Merlyn. Together with Saturnyne, he hoped to save this world from the corruption that threatened it. Instead, they encountered Earth-238's Mad Jim Jaspers, a lunatic with the ability to warp reality. Serving Jaspers were the Crazy Gang which included Executioner. This group of superhumans were based on characters from Lewis Carroll's Through the Looking-Glass. Captain Britain and Saturnyne individually managed to escape this Earth and Jaspers and the Crazy Gang, including Executioner, were killed when Earth-238 was destroyed by Saturnyne's successor, Mandragon.

JLA/Avengers
Executioner is among the villains enthralled by Krona to defend his stronghold.

In other media

Television
 Skurge the Executioner appears in "The Mighty Thor" segment of The Marvel Super Heroes.
 Skurge appears in The Super Hero Squad Show episode "Mental Organism Designed Only for Kisses!", voiced by Travis Willingham.
 Skurge the Executioner makes non-speaking appearances in The Avengers: Earth's Mightiest Heroes as the Enchantress' faithful servant and a member of the Masters of Evil until he is eventually incarcerated in Prison 42.
 Skurge the Executioner appears in Ultimate Spider-Man, voiced again by Travis Willingham.
 Skurge the Executioner appears in Avengers Assemble, voiced again by Travis Willingham. In the two-part episode "Avengers No More", he appears as a member of the Cabal and helps them scatter the Avengers across time and space. In the episode "The Most Dangerous Hunt", he chains the Hulk and Black Panther together, ties the former's transformations to a control crystal, and hunts them across Asgard.

Film

 Skurge the Executioner appears in Hulk vs. Thor.
 Skurge appears in Marvel Cinematic Universe film Thor: Ragnarok, portrayed by Karl Urban. This version served as Heimdall's replacement as the Bifrost Bridge's guardian and owns two M16 rifles that he acquired from "Tex-ass". Following Hela's takeover of Asgard, she recruits Skurge and dubs him her Executioner. However, he slowly begins to have second thoughts and attempts to flee along with the rest of its population. When Hela attempts to stop them, Skurge sacrifices himself to save his fellow Asgardians by holding back Hela's forces.

Video games
 The Executioner appears as a boss in Marvel: Ultimate Alliance voiced by Peter Lurie. This version is a member of Doctor Doom's Masters of Evil.
 The Executioner appears as a boss in Marvel: Avengers Alliance.
 The Executioner appears as a playable character in Marvel: Future Fight.

References

External links
 Executioner at Marvel.com

Characters created by Jack Kirby
Characters created by Stan Lee
Comics characters introduced in 1964
Fictional axefighters
Fictional characters with superhuman durability or invulnerability
Marvel Comics Asgardians
Marvel Comics characters who use magic
Marvel Comics characters with accelerated healing
Marvel Comics characters with superhuman strength
Marvel Comics giants
Marvel Comics supervillains